The Anglican Diocese of Okrika is one of ten within the Anglican Province of the Niger Delta, itself one of 14 provinces within the Church of Nigeria.

The diocese was established in 2003, the first bishop being Tubokosemie Abere. In October 2020 Enoch Atuboyedia became its second Bishop; he was consecrated a bishop on 21 September 2020 at the Cathedral Church of the Advent, Abuja.

Bishops

References

Church of Nigeria dioceses
Dioceses of the Province of Niger Delta
2003 establishments in Nigeria